The Red Bluff Round-Up is a major stop on the Professional Rodeo Cowboys Association (PRCA) circuit that takes place in Red Bluff, California, United States. It began in 1921 and was inducted to the ProRodeo Hall of Fame in 2015. The Round-Up is the largest three day rodeo in the country.

References

External links 
 Official website

Rodeo in the United States
ProRodeo Hall of Fame inductees
1921 establishments in California
Recurring sporting events established in 1921